Hotel Paradise is the debut and only album by American disco vocalist Diva Gray, recorded for and released on Columbia Records. The album features the title track and "St. Tropez". It was produced by Luigi Ojival, which this album on LP is credited "Diva Gray & Oyster".

Track listing
St. Tropez (Michel Gouty, Pierre Nacabal) 5:45
Up And Down (Gouty, Nacabal, Janice Marlene) 6:48
Hotel Paradise (Nacabal, Christine Bennett, Michel Beaucarty) 5:48
Good, Good Tequila (Beaucarty, Marlene, Nacabal) 6:47
Magic Carpet Ride (Bennett, Beaucarty, Nacabal) 4:39

Bonus digital track
Call Me (I Got What You Want)

Personnel
All vocals by Diva Gray
Music played by Oyster (Luigi Ojival)

External links
Hotel Paradise at Discogs
Hotel Paradise at Bandcamp.com

Columbia Records albums
1979 debut albums